Daelim College is a private technical college in South Korea.  The college is located in the Dongan-gu district of Anyang City, Gyeonggi province, south of Seoul, and is just across the Anyang River from Anyang Station.

Academics

The college's academic offerings are provided through divisions of Engineering, Humanities and Society, Arts, and Natural Science. There are about 110 faculty members.

History

The college first opened as Daelim Technology School (대림공업전문학교) in 1977.  It was established by the Daelim Educational Foundation, which is closely tied to the Daelim conglomerate.  It became a junior college in 1990.

See also
List of colleges and universities in South Korea
Education in South Korea

References

External links
Official school website, in English and Korean

Universities and colleges in Gyeonggi Province
1977 establishments in South Korea
Educational institutions established in 1977